Damien Farrell (born 17 March 1984) is an Antiguan and Barbudan footballer who plays as a defender for Sani Pro Fort Road.

Club career
Farrell started his career with Empire. He went on trial with AFC Bournemouth and Nottingham Forest following the end of the 2006–07 season. He also went on trial with Conference Premier club York City after he and Gayson Gregory had been recommended by Bryan Hamilton, a consultant for the Antiguan and Barbuda national team. Farrell and Gregory did not earn contracts, but York manager Billy McEwan said the two could still be brought back on trial during 2007–08. He joined All Saints United in 2008 and in November 2013 was playing for Sani Pro Fort Road.

International career
Farrell is an Antigua and Barbuda international, making his debut in a friendly match against Saint Vincent and the Grenadines on 27 August 2006. He played in two FIFA World Cup qualification matches. Farrell earned 15 caps from 2006 to 2008.

Career statistics
Source:

References

1984 births
Living people
Antigua and Barbuda footballers
Antigua and Barbuda international footballers
Association football defenders